Hassar affinis is a species of thorny catfish endemic to Brazil where it is found in the Parnaiba River basin.   This species grows to a length of  SL.

References 
 

Doradidae
Fish of South America
Fish of Brazil
Endemic fauna of Brazil
Fish described in 1881
Taxa named by Franz Steindachner